Safeguarded wharves are those wharves in London which have been given special status by the Mayor of London and the Port of London Authority (PLA) which ensures they are retained as working wharves and are protected from redevelopment into non-port use.

Nineteen operational and six non-operational or road served wharves are viable or capable of being made viable for cargo-handling and should be safeguarded by direction of the Deputy Prime Minister. Nineteen of the proposed sites are not viable for cargo-handling.

List of safeguarded wharves

Upper Reaches
Hurlingham Wharf
Swedish Wharf
Comley’s Wharf (RMC Fulham)
Western Riverside (waste transfer station)
Pier Wharf
Cremorne Wharf
Cringle Dock
Metro Greenham (RMC Battersea)
Middle Wharf (RMC Vauxhall)

Central London

Walbrook Wharf, City of London (waste transfer station)

London Docklands
See London Docks, Shadwell Basin, Limehouse Basin, Surrey Commercial Docks, West India Docks, Millwall Dock, East India Docks and the Royal Docks (which remains in use for boat exhibitioning) for the dock systems containing a great multitude of docks (some of which no longer exist) which were in commercial port operation until the 1970s/early 1980s.
Convoy's Wharf
Brewery Wharf
Tunnel Glucose
Victoria Deep Water Terminal
Northumberland Wharf
Orchard Wharf
Priors Wharf (Lower Lea Valley/Bow Creek)
Mayer Parry Wharf (EMR Canning Town) (Lower Lea Valley/Bow Creek)
Thames Wharf
Peruvian Wharf
Manhattan Wharf
Sunshine Wharf
Angerstein Wharf
Murphy’s Wharf (major existing aggregates terminal)
Riverside Wharf
Thames Refinery/(Tate & Lyle Jetty) (Cairn Mills; sugar)

Barking Creek
The following wharfs are located on the lower section of the River Roding, at Creekmouth.
Welbeck Wharf
Pinns Wharf
Kierbeck & Steel Wharves
Debden Wharf
Rippleway Wharf
Docklands Wharf
Victoria Stone Wharf
DePass Wharf

Dagenham Dock
RMC Roadstone
Pinnacle Terminal
White Mountain Roadstone
Hunts Wharf (Van Dalen)
Hanson Aggregates
Ford Dagenham Terminal

Erith Reach
Borax Wharf/Manor Wharf
Phoenix Wharf, Frog Island
Tilda Rice
Mulberry Wharf
Pioneer Wharf
Albion Wharf
RMC Erith
Railway Wharf (RMC)
Mayer Parry Wharf (EMR Erith/Mayer Parry Recycling)
Standard Wharf

See also
 List of locations in the Port of London

References

Infrastructure in London
London docks
Wharves in the United Kingdom